Briñas is a town and municipality in the province and autonomous community of La Rioja, Spain. 

The town is located 3 km to the north of Haro, on the opposite bank of the River Ebro, in the Rioja Alta wine region. 

As of 2011 it had a population of 249 people.

References

Populated places in La Rioja (Spain)